The Subcommittee on Human Rights (DROI) is a subcommittee of the Committee on Foreign Affairs of the European Parliament. It is responsible for issues of human rights and democracy, including ensuring their implementation in European Union policy, encouraging dialogue with international agencies and civil society, and providing a platform for reports on and analysis of human rights both within and outside the EU. During the Ninth European Parliament (2019–2024), the committee has 30 members and is chaired by Marie Arena from Belgium.

Members
As of 12 April 2022, the 30 members of the subcommittee are:

Chairpersons

See also 
 Sakharov Prize

References

External links

Human
Human rights organisations based in Belgium
Committees of the European Parliament

de:Ausschuss für auswärtige Angelegenheiten, Menschenrechte, Gemeinsame Sicherheit und Verteidigungspolitik#Unterausschuss für Menschenrechte